The 1988 British motorcycle Grand Prix was the twelfth round of the 1988 Grand Prix motorcycle racing season. It took place on the weekend of 5–7 August 1988 at Donington Park.

500 cc race report
The front row: Wayne Gardner, Eddie Lawson, Christian Sarron, Niall Mackenzie and Wayne Rainey.

Rainey and Mackenzie get a good launch, and through the first turn it's Rainey and he's opening a gap the field. Rainey is using carbon fiber brakes for the first time, which had only been tested and not raced on.

Kevin Schwantz is in around 8th place and tries to pass two or three riders simultaneously at the chicane, but crashes into Ron Haslam and causes a bottleneck. Haslam struggles to get out of the gravel and back into the race, and Schwantz is out with a broken kneecap. Marco Papa highsides out of the race.

Finishing the first lap it's Rainey, then a gap to Gardner, Sarron, and Mackenzie. Randy Mamola and Norihiko Fujiwara come together at the hairpin, but stay up.

Rainey is maintaining a gap, and Gardner makes a mistake at the chicane and lets Sarron and Mackenzie through, but he's soon back to 2nd. Mamola is sliding the rear and waving to the crowd.

On the last lap, McElnea highsides coming out of the chicane.

Rainey wins his first premier-class GP.

500 cc classification

References

British motorcycle Grand Prix
British
Motorcycle Grand Prix